Lake Aqqikkol is a saline lake in Xinjiang, China. The lake falls within the borders of Ruoqiang County, and is noted as being a gathering place for local and migratory birds.

References 

Lakes of Xinjiang